Louis Métezeau (1559 – 18 August 1615) was a French architect.

Life and career
He was born in Dreux, Eure-et-Loir, and died in Paris. He was the son of Thibault Métezeau, the brother of Clément II Métezeau and the nephew of Jean Métezeau. The register of the city of Dreux refers to him as architecte du roi et contrôleur des bâtiments royaux.

He probably undertook the construction of the Grande Galerie of the Louvre (the eastern section is traditionally attributed to him) and may have designed the Petite Galerie. He may also have conceived the Place des Vosges in Paris. An archival discovery of 1984 led some historians to name Louis Métezeau as the architect of the Hôtel d'Angoulême. It is now suggested that Louis' father, Thibault Métezeau, more likely designed it.

Métezeau was probably involved in the building of the Palais du Luxembourg for Marie de Medicis: she is believed to have sent him to Florence in 1611 to make drawings of the Palazzo Pitti, which was to be used as a model by the regent's order.

At his death he was identified as Premier Architecte du Roi of Henry IV of France.

Notes

Bibliography
 Ayers, Andrew (2004). The Architecture of Paris. Stuttgart; London: Edition Axel Menges. .
 Babelon, Jean-Pierre (1996). "Métezeau: (1) Louis Métezeau", vol. 21, p.p  345–346, in The Dictionary of Art, edited by Jane Turner, reprinted with minor corrections in 1998. . Also at Oxford Art Online.
 Ballon, Hilary (1991). The Paris of Henri IV: Architecture and Urbanism. Cambridge, Massachusetts: The MIT Press. .
 Gady, Alexandre (2008). Les hôtels particuliers de Paris, du Moyen-Âge à la Belle époque, Paris, Parigramme. 2012 edition: .
 Sturgis, Russell (1901). "Métezeau, Louis", vol. 2 (F–N), col. 868 in A Dictionary of Architecture and Building. New York: Macmillan.
 Thomson, David (1984). Renaissance Paris: Architecture and Growth, 1475-1600, Berkeley, University of California Press. .

External links

 "Louis Métezeau" at Structurae

Renaissance architects
16th-century French architects
17th-century French architects
People from Dreux
1560 births
1615 deaths
Year of birth uncertain